This is a list of electoral division results for the 2016 Australian federal election in the state of Victoria.

Overall results

Labor to Liberal: Chisholm

Liberal to National: Murray

Results by division

Aston

Ballarat

Batman

Bendigo

Bruce

Calwell

Notes

 The Liberal candidate John Hsu resigned from the party's ticket in June 2016. However, due to the AEC's nomination deadlines, Mr Hsu's name still appeared under the Liberal Party ticket on the ballot paper.

Casey

Chisholm

Corangamite

Corio

Deakin

Dunkley

Flinders

Gellibrand

Gippsland

Goldstein

Gorton

Higgins

Holt

Hotham

Indi

Isaacs

Jagajaga

Kooyong

La Trobe

Lalor

Mallee

Maribyrnong

McEwen

McMillan

Melbourne

Melbourne Ports

Menzies

Murray

Scullin

Wannon

Wills

References

Victoria 2016